Rajkumar Yadav, also known as Raju Yadav is an Indian politician and a member of the 16th and 17th Legislative Assembly of Uttar Pradesh in India. He represents the Mainpuri constituency of Uttar Pradesh and is a member of the Samajwadi Party political party.

Early life and  education
Rajkumar Yadav was born in Firozabad district. He attended Narayan College of Agra University.

Political career
Rajkumar Yadav has been a MLA for two terms. He represented the Mainpuri constituency and is a member of the Samajwadi Party political party.

Posts held

See also
 Mainpuri (Assembly constituency)
 Sixteenth Legislative Assembly of Uttar Pradesh
 Uttar Pradesh Legislative Assembly

References 

Samajwadi Party politicians
Uttar Pradesh MLAs 2012–2017
People from Mainpuri district
Dr. Bhimrao Ambedkar University alumni
1969 births
Living people